MTV Base was a 24-hour French subscription music channel operated by Viacom International Media Networks Europe.

History

A first channel, MTV Base UK was launched on 1 July 1999. This version of the channel will still be broadcast in France after the launch of the French version until 7 March 2008 where it is replaced by MTV Dance on Free and the other ADSL operators (as in all Europe except the UK and Ireland).

Launched on December 21, 2007, at 1pm, MTV Base focuses mainly on hip-hop and R'n'B. Its slogan is "La chaîne en Mode Hip-Hop R'n'B". It was launched on the second anniversary of the MTV Pulse and MTV Idol channels, complementing the channel offerings of the MTV Networks France bouquet. MTV Base is also for France "the reflection of the most popular musical genre in France" and targets in particular the 11/34 years.

In 2014, the channel changed targets by broadcasting less hip-hop music, and slowly began to focus on pop and dance content, such as One Direction, Taylor Swift and Calvin Harris.

MTV Base ceased broadcasting in France on November 17, 2015, along with MTV Pulse and MTV Idol, to be replaced by French version of MTV Hits and the new My MTV service.

Visual Identity (Logo)

Shows 
MTV Base News
Beats and Lyrics
Le Top Base 
Hits Base
Le Top US
Les 50 meilleurs clips vacances
French Only 
Les 10 meilleurs clips français

External links 
Official website
MTV Base France - presentation, screenshots

References

Music television channels
MTV channels
Defunct television channels in France
French-language television stations
Television channels and stations established in 2007
Television channels and stations disestablished in 2015
2007 establishments in France
2015 disestablishments in France
Music organizations based in France